Riopa guentheri, commonly known as Günther's supple skink or Günther's writhing skink, is a species of skink, which is endemic to India.

Etymology
The specific name, guentheri, is in honor of German-born British herpetologist Albert Günther.

Geographic range
R. guentheri has been known to occur in localities of erstwhile Bombay Presidency such as Matheran, Sholapur, Kurduwadi, Belgaum, and Uttara Kannada.

References

Further reading
Boulenger GA (1887). Catalogue of the Lizards in the British Museum (Natural History). Second Edition. Volume III. ... Scincidæ ... London: Trustees of the British Museum (Natural History). (Taylor and Francis, printers). xii + 575 pp. + Plates I-XL. (Lygosoma guentheri, pp. 311–312).
Boulenger GA (1890). The Fauna of British India, Including Ceylon and Burma. Reptilia and Batrachia. London: Secretary of State for India in Council. (Taylor and Francis, printers). xviii + 541 pp. (Lygosoma guentheri, pp. 209–210).
Günther ACLG (1864). The Reptiles of British India. London: The Ray Society. (Taylor and Francis, printers). xxvii + 452 pp. + Plates I-XXVI. (Eumeces punctatus, p. 93).
Peters W (1879). "Neue oder weniger bekannte Eidechsenarten aus der Familie der Scinci (Eumeces Güntheri, Euprepes notabilis, Ablepharus rutilus)". Sitzungs-Berichte der Gesellschaft Naturforschender Freunde zu Berlin 1879 (3): 35–37. ("Eumeces Güntheri ", new name, p. 36). (in German and Latin).
Smith MA (1935). The Fauna of British India, Including Ceylon and Burma. Reptilia and Amphibia. Vol. II.—Sauria. London: Secretary of State for India in Council. (Taylor and Francis, printers). xiii + 440 pp. + Plate I + 2 maps. (Riopa guentheri, pp. 319–320).

Riopa
Reptiles described in 1879
Reptiles of India
Endemic fauna of India
Taxa named by Wilhelm Peters
Taxobox binomials not recognized by IUCN